Shek Pai Wan Estate is a public housing estate in Shek Pai Wan of Aberdeen, Hong Kong, on a hill to the east of the town centre. It comprises eight standard residential blocks, a non-standard small household block, a primary school, a shopping centre and a bus terminus.

Background

Shek Pai Wan Estate was a resettlement estate and it consisted of seven blocks built between 1966 and 1968. In 1985, Block 2 was found to have structural problems by the Hong Kong Housing Authority, so it was firstly demolished in 1988.

The estate started redevelopment in 1998 and the redevelopment project was divided into three phases. However, Phases 1 and 2 were combined and renamed as Phase 1 whereas Phase 3 was renamed as Phase 2 later. There are seven new blocks completed in 2005 and 2007 respectively. Some of the flats were used to accommodate the tenants affected by the redevelopment of Wong Chuk Hang Estate.

Houses

Shek Pai Wan Estate has eight residential blocks with a total of around 5,300 flats.

Demographics
According to the 2016 by-census, Shek Pai Wan Estate had a population of 13,780. The median age was 49.3 and the majority of residents (98 per cent) were of Chinese ethnicity. The average household comprised 2.7 persons. The median monthly household income of all households (i.e. including both economically active and inactive households) was HK$17,780.

References

Aberdeen, Hong Kong
Public housing estates in Hong Kong
Residential buildings completed in 2005
Residential buildings completed in 2007